Richard "Dick" Charles Larson (born 1943) is an American operations researcher and educator. Since 1969, he has been a faculty member at the Massachusetts Institute of Technology with various appointments in the Departments of Electrical Engineering, Urban Studies and Planning, and the Institute for Data, Systems, and Society (IDSS). Larson is currently Post-Tenure Mitsui Professor of Data, Systems, and Society.

Early life
Richard Charles Larson was born in 1943 in Bayside, Queens, New York City to Gilbert C. Larson. Larson moved to Sunbury, Pennsylvania at the age of five. Six years later, he moved to North Plainfield, New Jersey. After graduating from Needham High School, Larson received his Bachelor of Science in 1965, Master of Science in 1967, and PhD in 1969, all in Electrical Engineering from the Massachusetts Institute of Technology.

Career
Larson's primary area of research is in urban systems, especially on the effectiveness and efficiency of urban emergency services. Beginning in the late 1960s under the auspices of the RAND Corporation, he studied police and other emergency services dispatch systems in New York City, resulting in a number of papers.

Later, Larson has shifted his research focus to technology-enabled learning. In 1995, became the Director of MIT's Center for Advanced Educational Services, which sought to use technology to provide educational content to a much wider audience. He held this role until 2003.

Larson currently serves as the Principal Investigator of the MIT BLOSSOMS initiative, which creates and distributes video lessons covering topics in math and science to students around the world. In addition, he is the Founder and Director of Learning International Networks Coalition, a professional society for utilizing technology to deliver quality education at scale.

As "Doctor Queue", Larson is frequently cited as an expert on queuing theory and the psychology of waiting in lines. He has appeared on National Public Radio and the Washington Post, among others.

Larson served as president of the Operations Research Society of America from 1993 to 1994, and then again in 2005 after it merged with the Institute for Operations Research and the Management Sciences (INFORMS). He was named a founding fellow of INFORMS in 2002. Larson currently serves as chairman of Structured Decisions Corporation (formerly QED).

Larson was elected a member of the National Academy of Engineering in 1993 for "developing and applying operations research methodologies in public and private-sector service industries".

Personal life
Larson married Susan Jean Wheeler at the MIT Chapel in 1969.

Publications
 Richard C. Larson, Urban Police Patrol Analysis, MIT Press, August 1972, 289 pages.
 Richard C. Larson, Amedeo R. Odoni, Urban Operations Research, Prentice Hall, 1981, 573 pages,.

Awards
 1972 – Larson's book Urban Police Patrol Analysis, published in 1972, was awarded the Frederick W. Lanchester Prize by the Operations Research Society of America.
 2002 – George E. Kimball Medal
 2003 – INFORMS President's Award
 2017 – Daniel Berg Lifetime Achievement Medal, International Academy of Information Technology and Quantitative Management, for "making contributions to technology innovation, service systems and strategic decision making"

References

External links
MIT profile
MIT's Center for Advanced Educational Services (CAES)
MIT BLOSSOMS
MIT's Learning International Networks Consortium (LINC)

1943 births
Date of birth missing (living people)
Living people
People from Bayside, Queens
People from Sunbury, Pennsylvania
People from North Plainfield, New Jersey
American operations researchers
MIT School of Engineering alumni
MIT School of Engineering faculty
Fellows of the Institute for Operations Research and the Management Sciences
MIT School of Architecture and Planning faculty